Wonderful World is a compilation album by American singer Eva Cassidy, released in 2004, eight years after her death in 1996. (see 2004 in music).

Track listing
"What a Wonderful World" (Bob Thiele, David Weiss) – 4:20
"Kathy's Song" (Paul Simon) – 2:45
"Say Goodbye" (Steven Digman, Andrew Hernandez) – 3:56
"Anniversary Song" (Steven Digman) – 2:51
"How Can I Keep from Singing?" (Traditional) – 4:27
"You Take My Breath Away" (Claire Hamill) – 5:40
"Drowning in the Sea of Love" (Kenneth Gamble, Leon Huff) – 4:18
"Penny to My Name" (Roger Henderson) – 3:39
"You've Changed" (Bill Carey, Carl Fischer) – 4:47
"It Doesn't Matter Anymore" (Paul Anka) – 3:13
"Waly Waly" (Traditional) – 4:39

Personnel
Eva Cassidy – acoustic guitar, guitar, vocals
Chris Biondo – bass, electric guitar
Chuck Brown – background vocals
Laura Byrne – flute
Mark Carson – piano
Dan Cassidy – violin
Steve Digman – guitar
Carolene Evans – strings
Mark Tufty Evans – strings, cello
Anthony Flowers – Hammond organ
Keith Grimes – acoustic guitar, guitar, electric guitar
Ian Lawther – bagpipes
Edgardo Malaga Jr. – strings
Raice McLeod – drums
Zan McLeod – bouzouki, guitar, mandolin
Joanne Opgenorth – strings
Uri Wassertzug – strings
Lenny Williams – organ, piano, keyboards

Production
Producers: Eva Cassidy, Chris Biondo, Lenny Williams
Mastering: Robert Vosgien
Arranger: Eva Cassidy
Drum Programming: Chris Biondo
Compilation: Bill Straw
Sequencing: Bill Straw
Design: Eileen White
Photography: Chris Biondo, Elaine Stonebraker
Liner Notes: Kevin Howlett

Charts

References

Eva Cassidy albums
2004 compilation albums